Behind Closed Shutters is a 1951 Italian crime-melodrama film directed by Luigi Comencini and starring Massimo Girotti, Eleonora Rossi Drago and Giulietta Masina.

Plot
Sandra (Rossi Drago) searches for her missing sister. For this, she enters the morally degraded seaside of Genoa.

Turin: Sandra, daughter of a guardian, is engaged to Roberto, employed in a construction company. The girl has a sister, Lucia, who has been estranged from home following a relationship deemed illicit. A friend of Lucia is killed and thrown into the Po; Desperate Lucia tries to commit suicide, in agony she telephones and asks Sandra for help. To find Lucia, Sandra asks for help from the ambiguous Edmondo, known in the prostitution world. Edmondo recognizes Lucia's photo, but does not reveal it to Sandra. The reality is bitter: Lucia is employed by Primavera, an exploiter. Edmondo tries to prevent Sandra from finding her sister; Lured into a local misunderstanding, Sandra is arrested in a police roundup. Released she manages to reconnect with the exploiters who offer a ransom to free Lucia.

A happy but daring ending with a shooting in the port of Genoa.

Cast
 Massimo Girotti as Roberto
 Eleonora Rossi Drago as Sandra
 Giulietta Masina as  Pippo
 Liliana Gerace as  Lucia
 Renato Baldini as Primavera
 Ottavio Senoret as Signorino
 Cesarina Gheraldi as Gianna 
 Antonio Nicotra as Barale 
 Renato Baldini as Primavera 
 Sidney Gordon as Il commissario 
 Goliarda Sapienza as La prostituta religiosa

References

Bibliography
 Luca Barattoni. Italian Post-Neorealist Cinema. Edinburgh University Press, 2013.

External links 
 
 

1951 films
Italian black-and-white films
1950s Italian-language films
Films scored by Carlo Rustichelli
Films set in Italy
Films set in Genoa
Lux Film films
Films directed by Luigi Comencini
Italian drama films
1951 drama films
Melodrama films
1950s Italian films